Gore Creek may refer to the following watercourses:

in Australia
Gore Creek (New South Wales)

in the United States
Gore Creek (Colorado)
Gore Creek (North Carolina) in North Carolina
Gore Creek (Oregon) in Oregon